The Institut de recherche en informatique et systèmes aléatoires is a joint computer science research center of CNRS, University of Rennes 1, ENS Rennes, INSA Rennes and Inria, in Rennes in Brittany. It is one of the eight Inria research centers.

Created in 1975 as a spin-off of the University of Rennes 1, merging the young computer science department and a few mathematicians, more specifically probabilists, among them Michel Métivier, who was to become the first president of IRISA.

Research topics span from theoretical computer science, such as formal languages, formal methods, or more mathematically oriented topics such as information theory, optimization, complex system... to application-driven topics like bioinformatics, image and video compression, handwriting recognition, computer graphics, medical imaging, content-based image retrieval.

See also 
French space program

Space program of France
Aerospace engineering organizations
Computer science institutes in France
France
Research institutes in France
French National Centre for Scientific Research
1975 establishments in France